Twins Affair is a music duo from Ilorin, Nigeria.

Early life 
Twins Affair, made up of twin brothers born as Taye Damilola Olusola and Kehinde Rotimi Olusola on 14th April, 1984, are Recording artists, music producers, and journalists. The group is one of the Nigerian's top duet artistes that has been ranked next to P-Square as Africa's No.1 hip-hop duet artistes, they are also among the few top Nigerian artistes that produce their own songs. As trained journalists, the Twins Affair floats an online Entertainment news website TWINS GIST ONLINE MAGAZINE.

The duo of Taye Damilola Olusola and Kehinde Rotimi Olusola (Twins Affair) who are the only children of their parents have not only been doing things together but they have been classmates in all the schools/institutions they attended, such as the Family Support Primary School, Kabba, Kogi State from 1993 to 1998; St Barnabas Secondary School Kabba, Kogi State from 1998 to 2004; Delta State University, Abraka, Nigeria from 2005 to 2010 (B.A Hons Music); International Institute of Journalism, Abuja Nigeria, from 2013 to 2014 (Post Graduate Diploma in Journalism). The duo also did a three-month Music production course in 2011 at Life Line Studio, Allen Avenue, Lagos under the tutelage of an ace music Producer, T.Y Snoop who is one of the producers of Mr. Olu Maintain.

Musical career 
The Twins Affair's involvement in music is at the instance of their multi-instrumentalist father, Mr. Olusola Ogungbemi, who taught them how to play the keyboard, guitar, drum set and saxophone at the age of four. At the age of 9, Taye and Kehinde were the keyboardists and bass guitarists, respectively, of the Living Faith Church Worldwide, Kabba, Kogi State, Nigeria.

Twins Affair recorded their first album in 1999 tagged "Egunje has sploit everything". The album was produced by music Producer/Musicologist, Austin Emielu, senior lecturer at the University of Ilorin, Nigeria became an instant hit. The success of the maiden album spurred the Twins Affair to go to the studio a year later in 2000 to record another album tagged "Why fighting, why killing" in response to the religious conflicts in the then Northern Nigeria. The two albums released by the Twins Affair did not accord the group national recognition as its popularity was only confined to about six states in the North out of the 36 states in Nigeria. The frustration of the inability of the group to penetrate Lagos, which is the nerve center of music/entertainment in Nigeria, compelled her to go on a sabbatical.

In their second year in the University (2008), the Twins Affair came out with an Album tagged 'AREA'. The album however flopped due to poor publicity and the unserious attitude of the marketer. This was followed some months later by the release of an audio and video single tagged 'SKELEBE'. Although the video was aired on local and international television stations, Twins Affair was still not given the proper recognition it deserved in the Nigerian music industry.

In 2010, the Twins Affair released an audio and video single tagged 'ASA'. The single became an instant hit. This was followed by another hit single and video in 2011 tagged 'O bad gan'. With these two singles, the Twins Affair became a household name in the Nigerian music scene. The Twins Affair has also featured and produced many top Nigerian artists such as LKT, Yung6ix, Slay, Aq, Maytronomy, Nene Johnson, Ms. Chief, Nenjazi a Nigerian American-based artiste just to mention a few.

In the area of music education, Twins Affair is taught at the prestigious PEFTI Film Institute Lagos, Nigeria owned by the doyen of the Nigerian entertainment industry, Wale Adenuga Production (Super Story) from 2012 until 2013 where they resigned their appointments as Music Lecturers/Studio Music producers to enable them to proceed to the International Institute of Journalism, Abuja for a one-year Post-Graduate Diploma in Journalism. The Twins Affair is a force to be reckoned with in Nigeria either as Music Producers or Recording artists. Their recent works such as BEAUTIFUL ft. M kel, GO THERE, and MELODY ft MS. Chief and Nenjazi attest to this fact.

Awards 
 Real Sound Entertainment in conjunction with Radio Kogi, Lokoja Kogi State BEST CREW ARTISTES OF THE YEAR AWARD.

References 

Musical groups established in 1999
Nigerian hip hop groups
Nigerian male musicians
Nigerian contemporary R&B musical groups
Twin musical duos
Nigerian twins
Yoruba musicians
Nigerian musical duos
Nigerian boy bands
People from Ilorin
21st-century Nigerian male singers
Yoruba-language singers
Fraternal twins
Male musical duos
1999 establishments in Nigeria